The men's 400 metres competition of the athletics event at the 2015 Southeast Asian Games was held on 12 June at the National Stadium in Singapore.

Records
Prior to this competition, the existing Asian and Games records were as follows:

The following records were established during the competition:

Schedule

Results

Round 1

 Qualification: First 3 in each heat (Q) and the next 2 fastest (q) advance to the final.

Heat 1

Heat 2

Final

References

See also

Men's 400 metres